Jitendra Nath Lahiri was one of the Bengali visionaries of early 20th century. A revolutionary turned industrialist and later into a leading politician, he was instrumental in defining the Indian entity during the British Raj for his hometown, Serampore, a suburban settlement near Calcutta.

He was born into one of the well-off families in Serampore, the Lahiri family. Ever since his childhood he had been an outstanding student. He went on to become the second Indian to complete his education from the University of California, Berkeley (USA).  It was during his stay in Berkeley that Jitendra Nath developed a strong interest in nationalism. He went on to actively support the "Ghadar Group", with the objective to free India from British rule.

Jitendra Nath through his Ghadar connections came in touch with Jatin Mukherjee, better known as "Bagha Jatin", one of the extremist leaders in the Indian Freedom movement.  Jitendra Nath operated out of the underground units in Germany and was one of the key facilitators in connecting the Indian extremist units with the Helferrich brothers in Germany. The hope was to mobilize arms and ammunitions strategically with German help and strategically oust British from India. Although his name did not come up in the leading list of revolutionaries associated with the Christmas Day Plot of 1915, he played a significant role behind the scenes. He was on board of the Maverick, the vessel which was responsible for shipping arms and ammunitions into India. However, owing to the unfortunate capture of "Bagha Jatin", this mission was abandoned at the Bay of Bengal. Subsequently, Jitendra Nath went underground.

But this failed attempt to make a difference in the Imperial India did not daunt the revolutionary spirits of Jitendra Nath. He envisioned that a strong socio-economic Indian entity would help in shaking up the Imperialist yoke. He then went on to use his academic training in polymer technology to establish India's first belting company, the Bengal Belting Company. He invested most of his family fortune for developing this factory and then went ahead to utilize all profit returns for the socio-economic development of Serampore. In fact, the huge employment opportunities created coupled with infrastructure developments that he brought in, helped in defining the industrial development of Serampore and surrounding towns.
 
In his strife to spread industrial revolution in India, Jitendra Nath joined Acharya Prafulla Chandra Ray. When the Indian Chemical Council was formed in the 1938 under the leadership of the Acharya, Jitendra Nath became one of its early members. Subsequently, he was elected to preside over the council in 1943-44.

The revolutionary in Jitendra Nath inspired him to take up a political career in his march ahead to change the face of Serampore.  Highly influenced by the radical philosophies of Dr. Bidhan Chandra Ray, he joined the Indian National Congress. He continued to be an active member of the party before and after the Indian independence. He was elected as a member of the Indian Parliament during the first two general elections.  Owing to his failing health, he retired from active politics in 1960s. However until his death in 1975, Jitendra Nath concentrated bringing in social reforms in his home town of Serampore.

References 
M. S. A. Rao: Urban sociology in India: reader and source book, p. 139

See also 
 Christmas Day Plot
 Bagha Jatin

Bengali politicians
Indian National Congress politicians